Triangle Island is a small island, approximately  in area, located off the northwestern tip of Vancouver Island, British Columbia, Canada. The island is notable for being the location of British Columbia's largest seabird colony, hosting such species as the Cassin's auklet and the tufted puffin. The Cassin's auklet population is the world's largest. The island is administratively a part of the Scott Islands Marine Wildlife Area and is more specifically home to the Anne Vallée Triangle Island Ecological Reserve, named after a researcher who frequented the island and died there in an accident in 1982. Visiting the island requires permits from the British Columbia Ministry of Environment, and it is usually frequented only by researchers. It is the westernmost and most remote island in British Columbia, save for Haida Gwaii, which is off the coast of northern British Columbia. The island takes its name from its triangular appearance on sea navigation charts.

A lighthouse existed on the island from 1909 to 1919 but was abandoned due to severe fog, regular hurricane-force winds, and conditions utterly repellent to human habitation. The island is otherwise uninhabited, aside from a small cabin for research use. In 2004, the lantern room from the lighthouse was moved to the Sooke Region Museum, though the base remains on Triangle Island.

The island was the site of ancient First Nations hunting and egg-collecting activities.

Access to the island is tightly regulated and requires a permit. Environment and Climate Change Canada is proposing all of the Scott Islands and its adjacent waters be designated as marine national wildlife area under Canada Wildlife Act.

See also
Lanz and Cox Islands Provincial Park, two of the other Scott Islands

References

Islands of British Columbia
Uninhabited islands of British Columbia